Meskhetian Turks, also referred to as Turkish Meskhetians, Ahiska Turks, and Turkish Ahiskans, (Meskhetis turk'ebi) are an ethnic subgroup of Turks formerly inhabiting the Meskheti region of Georgia, along the border with Turkey. The Turkish presence in Meskheti began with the Turkish military expedition of 1578, although Turkic tribes had settled in the region as early as the eleventh and twelfth centuries.

Today, the Meskhetian Turks are widely dispersed throughout the former Soviet Union (as well as in Turkey and the United States) due to forced deportations during World War II. At the time, the Soviet Union was preparing to launch a pressure campaign against Turkey and Joseph Stalin wanted to clear the strategic Turkish population in Meskheti who were likely to be hostile to Soviet intentions. In 1944, the Meskhetian Turks were accused of smuggling, banditry and espionage in collaboration with their kin across the Turkish border. Expelled by Joseph Stalin from Georgia in 1944, they faced discrimination and human rights abuses before and after deportation. Approximately 115,000 Meskhetian Turks were deported to Central Asia and subsequently only a few hundred have been able to return to Georgia as Georgia does not allow repatriation. Those who migrated to Ukraine in 1990 settled in shanty towns, inhabited by seasonal workers.

Origins and terms

Most Meskhetian Turks identify themselves as having descended from Ottoman settlers. Pro-Georgian historiography has traditionally argued that the Meskhetian Turks, who speak the Kars dialect of the Turkish language and belong to the Hanafi school of Sunni Islam, are simply Turkified Meskhetians (an ethnographic subgroup of Georgians) converted to Islam in the period between the sixteenth century and 1829, when the region of Samtskhe–Javakheti (Historical Meskheti) was under the rule of the Ottoman Empire. However, the Russian anthropologist and historian Professor Anatoly Michailovich Khazanov has argued against the pro-Georgian narrative and has said that:

Anthropologist Kathryn Tomlinson has pointed out that in Soviet documents about the 1944 deportations of the Meskhetian Turks, the community were referred to simply as "Turks" because of their faith Islam, not only them but also every Muslim of Georgia was referred as Turks and that it was after their second deportation from Uzbekistan that the term "Meskhetian Turks" was invented. According to Ronald Wixman, the term "Meskhetian" only came into use in the late 1950s. Indeed, the majority of the Meskhetian Turks call themselves simply as "Turks" or "Ahiskan Turks" referring to the region, meaning "Turks of Ahiska Region". The Meskhetians claim sometimes that the medieval Cumans-Kipchaks of Georgia (Kipchaks in Georgia) may have been one of their possible ancestors. According to historians, it is less likely because part of the Kipchaks left Georgia during the invasion of Mongols, while others joined Mongols.

History

Ottoman conquest
By the Peace of Amasya (1555), Meskheti was divided into two, with the Safavids keeping the eastern part and the Ottomans gaining the western part. In 1578, the Ottomans attacked the Safavid possessions in Georgia, which initiated the Ottoman–Safavid War of 1578–1590, and by 1582 the Ottomans were in possession of the eastern (Safavid) part of Meskheti. The Safavids regained control over the eastern part of Meskheti in the early 17th century. However, by the Treaty of Zuhab (1639), all of Meskheti fell under Ottoman control, and it brought an end to Iranian attempts to retake the region.

Soviet rule

1944 deportation from Georgia to Central Asia

On 15 November 1944, the then General Secretary of CPSU, Joseph Stalin, ordered the deportation of over 115,000 Meskhetian Turks from their homeland, who were secretly driven from their homes and herded onto rail cars. As many as 30,000 to 50,000 deportees died of hunger, thirst and cold and as a direct result of the deportations and the deprivations suffered in exile. The Soviet guards dumped the Meskhetian Turks at rail sidings across a vast region, often without food, water, or shelter.

According to the 1989 Soviet Census, 106,000 Meskhetian Turks lived in Uzbekistan, 50,000 in Kazakhstan, and 21,000 in Kyrgyzstan. As opposed to the other nationalities who had been deported during World War II, no reason was given for the deportation of the Meskhetian Turks, which remained secret until 1968. It was only in 1968 that the Soviet government finally recognised that the Meskhetian Turks had been deported. The reason for the deportation of the Meskhetian Turks was because in 1944 the Soviet Union was preparing to launch a pressure campaign against Turkey. In June 1945 Vyacheslav Molotov, who was then Minister of Foreign Affairs, presented a demand to the Turkish Ambassador in Moscow for the surrender of three Anatolia provinces (Kars, Ardahan and Artvin). As Moscow was also preparing to support Armenian claims to several other Anatolian provinces, war against Turkey seemed possible, and Joseph Stalin wanted to clear the strategic Georgian-Turkish border where the Meskhetian Turks were settled and who were likely to be hostile to such Soviet intentions.

Unlike the other deported Muslim groups, the Meskhetians have not been rehabilitated nor permitted to return to their homeland. In April 1970, the leaders of the Turkish Meskhetian national movement applied to the Turkish Embassy in Moscow for permission to emigrate to Turkey as Turkish citizens if the Soviet government persisted its refusal to allow them to resettle in Meskheti. However, the response of the Soviet government was to arrest the Meskhetian leaders.

1989 deportation from Uzbekistan to other Soviet countries

In 1989, riots broke out between the Meskhetian Turks who had settled in Uzbekistan and the native Uzbeks. Nationalist resentments against the Meskhetians who had competed with Uzbeks for resources in the overpopulated Fergana Valley boiled over. Hundreds of Meskhetian Turks were killed or injured, nearly 1,000 properties were destroyed and thousands of Meskhetian Turks fled into exile. The majority of Meskhetian Turks, about 70,000, went to Azerbaijan, whilst the remainder went to various regions of Russia (especially Krasnodar Krai), Kazakhstan, Kyrgyzstan and Ukraine.

Khojaly Massacre 
Meskhetian Turk refugees who had been persecuted in Central Asia were relocated to Azerbaijan where they settled in Khojaly before being subsequently massacred along with Azerbaijanis in 1992.

Russian journalist Victoria Ivleva took photos of the town streets strewn with dead bodies of its inhabitants, including women and children. She described Meskhetian Turks from Khojaly who were captured by Armenian militants and she was hit by an Armenian soldier who took her for one of the captives when she was helping a Meskhetian Turk woman falling behind the crowd with four children, one of which wounded, and the other one newly born.

Russo-Ukrainian War 
Around 2,000 Meskhetian Turks have been forced to flee from their homes in Ukraine since May 2014 amid fighting between government forces and pro-Russian separatists. Turkish Meskhetian community representative in the eastern city of Donetsk, Nebican Basatov, said that those who have fled have sought refuge in Russia, Azerbaijan, Turkey and different parts of Ukraine. Over 300 Meskhetian Turks from the Turkish-speaking minority in eastern Ukraine have arrived in eastern Turkey's Erzincan province where they will live under the country's recently adopted asylum measures.

Demographics 

According to the 1989 Soviet Census, there were 207,502 Turks living in the Soviet Union. However, Soviet authorities recorded many Meskhetian Turks as belonging to other nationalities such as "Azeri", "Kazakh", "Kyrgyz", and "Uzbek". Hence, official censuses do not necessarily show a true reflection of the real population of the Meskhetian Turks; for example, according to the 2009 Azerbaijani census, there were 38,000 Turks living in the country; however, no distinction is made in the census between Meskhetian Turks and Turks from Turkey who have become Azerbaijani citizens, as both groups are classified in the official census as "Turks" or "Azerbaijani". According to the United Nations High Commissioner for Refugees report published in 1999, that 100,000 Meskhetian Turks lived in Azerbaijan and the defunct Baku Institute of Peace and Democracy stated, in 2001, that between 90,000 and 110,000 Meskhetian Turks lived in Azerbaijan, similarly, academic estimates have also suggested that the Turkish Meskhetian community of Azerbaijan numbers 90,000 to 110,000.
 
More recently, some Meskhetian Turks in Russia, especially those in Krasnodar, have faced hostility from the local population. The Krasnodar Meskhetian Turks have suffered significant human rights violations, including the deprivation of their citizenship. They are deprived of civil, political and social rights and are prohibited from owning property and employment. Thus, since 2004, many Turks have left the Krasnodar region for the United States as refugees. A large number of them, comprising nearly 1300 individuals, is in Dayton, Ohio. They are still barred from full repatriation to Georgia. Apart from that, in Georgia, racism against Meskheti Turks is still prevalent due to differences in beliefs and ethnic tensions.

Culture

Religion
Most Meskhetian Turks are Sunni Muslims and a minority are Shiite Muslims.

Language
The Meskhetian Turks speak an Eastern Anatolian dialect of Turkish, which hails from the regions of Kars, Ardahan, and Artvin. The Turkish Meskhetian dialect has also borrowed from other languages (including Azerbaijani, Georgian, Kazakh, Kyrgyz, Russian, and Uzbek) which the Meskhetian Turks have been in contact with during the Russian and Soviet rule.

Wedding 

Meskhetian Turks' weddings consist of a traditional proposal from the groom's parents and if the bride's parents accept the proposal, an engagement party, or Nişan, is done. Everyone at the Nişan is given a ceremonial sweet drink, called Sharbat. The actual wedding lasts for two days. On the first day the bride leaves her house and on the second day is when the marriage happens. Before the bride enters her husband's house she uses the heel on her shoe to break two plates with her foot and applies honey on the doorway. This tradition serves the purpose of wishing happiness upon the new bride and groom in their marriage. At the end of the wedding, a dance ensues with the men and women dancing separately. Finally, the newlyweds have their last dance which is called the ‘Waltz’ and that completes the wedding.

Cicrumcision 
The Religious male circumcision Ceremony of the Ahiska Turks, is hold in a big way of Dance, Music, Guests, rezitation of the Koran and a special  Kirve (Sandek)

Notable people

The following is list of people of Turkish Meshetian origin:

, Azerbaijani artist 
Fatih Ahıskalı, Turkish musician
Taner Akçam, Turkish historian
Celal Al, Turkish actor in Diriliş: Ertuğrul and Kuruluş: Osman
, Turkish politician
Aslan Atem, Turkish wrestler
Tevfik Arif, Kazakh-Turkish billionaire, real estate developer and investor residing in the US
Refik Arif, Kazakh businessman 
, Turkish poet
Isgender Aznaurov, Uzbek-born National Hero of Azerbaijan who fought in the First Nagorno-Karabakh War
Ömürbek Babanov, Kyrgyz billionaire and politician who served as Prime Minister of Kyrgyzstan (2011-2012)
Yusuf Rıza Bey, Ottoman soldier in the Teşkilât-ı Mahsusa special forces
, Turkish painter and museologist 
, Turkish actor
, Azerbaijani literary critic 
Ata Demirer, Turkish filmmaker and comedian
, one of the first female journalists, educators, writers and philanthropists in Azerbaijan
, Turkish linguist and Turkologist 
, Azerbaijani military doctor
, Azerbaijani ashik 
, Azerbaijani scientist
, Azerbaijani scientist 
, Azerbaijani literary critic 
, lawyer and mystic 
Niyaz Ilyasov, Russian judoka; medalists in the 2018 and 2019 World Judo Championships
Elvira Kamaloğlu, Ukrainian-born Turkish female wrestler
, Uzbek football coach 
Timur Kapadze, Uzbek football player
Handan Musaoğlu Kasa, Turkish presenter on TBMM TV
Mediha Kayra, Ottoman-Turkish writer and teacher
Abubekir Kurşumov, Russian architect and owner of the KavkazStroyGrupp construction company
Movlud Miraliyev, Uzbek-born Azerbaijani judoka
Mukhtar Mukhtarov, Kazakh football player 
Bahram Muzaffer, Uzbek boxer
Ömer Faik Nemanzade, Azerbaijani journalist 
, Russian war hero during the Great Patriotic War
Fatih Osmanlı, Kazakh-born actor in the Turkish historical drama Kuruluş: Osman
Buğra Öner, Turkish professional boxer
Alptuğ Öner, Turkish professional boxer
Cüneyt Özdemir, Turkish journalist
, Ottoman statesman 
Ahmad bey Pepinov, Azerbaijani Minister of Agriculture
Mikail Suleymanov, Uzbek actor, copywriter and film director
Ravil Tagir, Kazakh-born Turkish football player
Fırat Tanış, Turkish actor
Yalçın Topçu, Turkish politician and former Ministry of Culture and Tourism
, Uzbek-Russian educator

See also 
 Turkish communities and minorities in the former Ottoman Empire
 Turks in the former Soviet Union
 Meskhetians
 Meskheti

Notes

Bibliography 

 
 
 .
 
 
 .
 .
 .
 .
 .
 
 .
 .
 
 .
 
 .
 .
 .
 
 .
 
 
 .

Further reading

 
 Robert Conquest, The Nation Killers: The Soviet Deportation of Nationalities (London: Macmillan, 1970)
 S. Enders Wimbush and Ronald Wixman, "The Meskhetian Turks: A New Voice in Central Asia," Canadian Slavonic Papers 27, Nos. 2 and 3 (Summer and Fall, 1975): 320-340
 Alexander Nekrich, The Punished Peoples: The Deportation and Fate of Soviet Minorities at the End of the Second World War (New York: W. W. Norton, 1978).
 Emma Kh. Panesh and L. B. Ermolov (Translated by Kevin Tuite). Meskhetians. World Culture Encyclopedia. Accessed on September 1, 2007.

External links

 
Turkish diaspora
Peoples of the Caucasus
Ethnic groups in Georgia (country)
Ethnic groups in Azerbaijan
Ethnic groups in Russia
Muslim communities of Russia
Turkic peoples of Asia
Turkish communities outside Turkey
Islam in Georgia (country)
Turkic peoples of Europe
Muslim communities of the Caucasus